That '90s Show is an American television period teen sitcom set during the summer of 1995, featuring characters and locales that debuted in its predecessor, That '70s Show. It premiered on Netflix on January 19, 2023. In February 2023, the series was renewed for a second season.

Premise
The show centers on Leia Forman, the teenage daughter of Eric Forman and Donna Pinciotti, forming bonds with other teenagers as she spends the summer of 1995 with her grandparents Red and Kitty in Point Place, Wisconsin, 15 years after the events of That '70s Show.

Cast

Main

 Debra Jo Rupp as Kitty Forman, Leia's paternal grandmother
 Kurtwood Smith as Red Forman, Leia's paternal grandfather
 Callie Haverda as Leia Forman, a smart, snarky teenager who craves adventure, and is the daughter of Eric Forman and Donna Pinciotti from the original series
 Ashley Aufderheide as Gwen Runck, a rebellious Riot grrrl with a loyal heart
 Mace Coronel as Jay Kelso, a charming, flirty young videographer, Leia's love interest, the son of Michael Kelso and Jackie Burkhart
 Reyn Doi as Ozzie, an insightful and perceptive teen who is openly gay
 Sam Morelos as Nikki, Nate's ambitious and intelligent girlfriend
 Maxwell Acee Donovan as Nate Runck, Gwen's easygoing and fun-loving older half-brother, and Nikki's boyfriend

Recurring
 Andrea Anders as Sherri Runck, the Formans' new neighbor and Gwen and Nate's mother who is in a relationship with Fez
 Laura Prepon as Donna Forman, Leia's mother, Eric's wife, and an author
 Wilmer Valderrama as Fez, a popular hair stylist

Guest stars
 Topher Grace as Eric Forman, Leia's father, and an adjunct religion professor
 Mila Kunis as Jackie Burkhart, Jay's mother and Kelso's wife
 Ashton Kutcher as Michael Kelso, Jay's father, and Jackie's husband
 Tommy Chong as Leo Chingkwake, Point Place's local hippie who was friends with the original cast
 Don Stark as Bob Pinciotti, Leia's maternal grandfather
 Brian Austin Green as Brian Austin Green, a fictionalized version of himself who reprised his Beverly Hills, 90210 role as David Silver in the Point Place, 53140 dream sequences that spoofed the series
 Jim Rash as Fenton, Fez's former landlord in the original series, now Sherri's landlord

Episodes

Production
The sitcom That '70s Show aired on Fox for eight seasons from 1998 to 2006, centering around the lives of teenagers from 1976 to 1979. The show garnered additional popularity after its conclusion due to its availability on Netflix, before leaving the platform in September 2020.

In October 2021, Netflix announced a spin-off of the series, titled That '90s Show, with Kurtwood Smith and Debra Jo Rupp reprising their roles as Red and Kitty Forman, respectively. It is produced by The Carsey-Werner Company, with Gregg Mettler serving as showrunner and Bonnie Turner, Terry Turner, their daughter Lindsay Turner, Marcy Carsey, Tom Werner, Smith and Rupp as executive producers.

Ten episodes were ordered, with the series taking on a multi-cam format like the original. The show was filmed in front of a live studio audience at Sunset Bronson Studios in Los Angeles between February 7 and July 21, 2022.

In February 2022, Callie Haverda, Ashley Aufderheide, Mace Coronel, Maxwell Acee Donovan, Reyn Doi and Sam Morelos joined the cast as series regulars. It was also reported that Topher Grace, Laura Prepon, Mila Kunis, Ashton Kutcher, and Wilmer Valderrama would appear in recurring roles. It was expected that Danny Masterson would not appear due to accusations made against him, and a pending criminal trial at that time; Masterson ultimately did not appear and his character of Steven Hyde was simply not mentioned on the series. Two supporting characters from the original series, Laurie Forman and Midge Pinciotti, also did not appear due to the deaths of their respective actresses (Lisa Robin Kelly and Tanya Roberts). Production commenced February 6. On April 30, 2022, it was announced that Grace, Prepon, Kunis, Kutcher, and Valderrama would all return for guest appearances. On February 3, 2023, Netflix renewed the series for a 16-episode second season.

Release
The first season of That '90s Show released onto Netflix on January 19, 2023.

Reception

Audience viewership 
During its debut week, That '90s Show ranked at number five on Netflix's Top 10 TV English titles just three days after its release with 41.08 million hours viewed. The following week, the series reached number four and garnered 26.25 million viewing hours.

Critical response 
On the review aggregator website Rotten Tomatoes, the series holds an approval rating of 76% based on 49 critic reviews,  with an average rating of 6.4/10. The website's critical consensus reads, "A solidly serviceable sequel series, That '90s Show may take a little time to find its rhythm, but still delivers a respectable number of warmly nostalgic laughs." Metacritic, which uses a weighted average, assigned a score of 58 out of 100 based on 21 critics, indicating "mixed or average reviews".

The Hollywood Reporter Angie Han wrote: "[That '90s Show] aims for nothing much more ambitious than re-creating the low-key charm of its predecessor. But it hits that target with enough confidence and consistency to become a treat in its own right." Steve Greene, writing for IndieWire, viewed it "better than it [had] any right to be," praising the new cast's "easy" chemistry and the performances of Smith and Rupp. Brian Lowry of CNN dubbed it "high in nostalgia but only half-baked," while Lucy Mangan at The Guardian found it likable enough and nostalgic.

Manuel Betancourt of The A.V. Club gave the series a B and said, "If you grew up watching That '70s Show, you'll likely have no way of assessing whether That '90s Show works on its own. Maybe it can't. And maybe it doesn't even want to." Alan Sepinwall, in a column for Rolling Stone, expressed doubt that the multi-cam approach could find an audience in the streaming era; Chicago Sun-Times veteran Richard Roeper gave a rating of two out of four stars and described it as "a little edgy and occasionally chuckle-inducing and mostly sweet-natured, and it's just OK and quickly forgettable."

References

External links
 
 

2020s American teen sitcoms
2023 American television series debuts
American sequel television series
English-language Netflix original programming
Green Bay Packers
Television series about families
Television series about teenagers
Television series by Carsey-Werner Productions
Television series set in 1995
Television shows set in Wisconsin
That '70s Show